Vilardi is an Italian surname. Notable people with the surname include:

Emma May Vilardi (1922–1990), American author and adoption reunion advocate
Gabriel Vilardi (born 1999), Canadian ice hockey player
Pepê (footballer, born 1998) (real name João Pedro Vilardi Pinto), Brazilian footballer
Jay Vilardi, American guitarist

See also
Vilard (disambiguation)
Villard (surname), a similarly spelled surname
Villari (surname), a similarly spelled surname

Italian-language surnames